Pamela Long may refer to:

Pam Long (born 1953), American actress and writer
Pamela Long (singer), member of the band Total
Pamela O. Long (born 1943), American historian of science and technology